Al-Zahra Mosque is one of the Shiite (Shia) mosques of the United States of America that was founded in 1990 in the city of Los Angeles, California. This Shi'i mosque has been a place for Shia Muslims in order to meet the needs of the Los Angeles Shi'a community since its founding date.

According to "Seyyed-Ruhollah Jayedi" the head of the Al-Zahra mosque: This mosque may be the first Shi'a mosque or among the first Shia mosques in America; and some other Islamic centers in the city of Los-Angeles are considered to be a branch from this mosque. Al-Zahra Mosque was built by an Iraqi businessman—named Hakim in 1990.

The name of Al-Zahra Mosque is taken from the name of Fatimah Zahra—the daughter of the Islamic prophet, Muhammad. Among the daily/weekly programs of Al-Zahra mosque are as follows: daily prayers, Friday-prayer (per Friday), Dua-Kumayl, Dua-Tawassul, and so on.

See also 
 Ahl Al-Bayt World Assembly
 Al-Zahra Mosque (Australia)

References

1990 establishments in the United States
Mosques in California
Mosques completed in 1990
Shia mosques in the United States